Vladimir Semyonovich Kemenov (2 June 1908 – 14 June 1988) was a Soviet art historian and statesman who headed the VOKS for the USSR in the 1940s.

Life and career 

He was born in Yekaterinoslav (now Dnipro).

In 1940, he succeeded Viktor Smirnov as chairman of VOKS ("Vsesoiuznoe Obshchestvo Kul'turnoi Sviazi s zagranitsei" — Всесоюзное общество культурной связи с заграницей — All-Union Society for Cultural Relations with Foreign Countries), a propaganda organization created in 1925 and restructured in 1958.    VOKS also often served as a convenient 'roof' for operations of both branches of Soviet intelligence, whose residents and operatives used opportunities provided by VOKS to establish and maintain contacts in intellectual, scientific and government circles. These contacts were, for the most part, unaware that they were dealing not with 'cultural representatives' and diplomats, but with intelligence officers.    In 1944, Mihail Sadoveanu hosted official Soviet envoys Kemenov and Andrey Vyshinsky in Romania shortly before he became president of the ARLUS "Literary and Philosophical Section."

On June 23, 1945, Kemenov wrote the Soviet National Council of Foreign Affairs to request that the Soviet Union send artists to the United States and United Kingdom; the request met little interest. In 1947, Kemenov joined Alexander Fadeyev in asking the USSR to invite American writer John Steinbeck to visit; the Kremlin declined.

In 1948, Andrei Denisov succeeded Kemenov as chairman through 1957. In 1958, VOKS became the Union of Soviet Societies for Friendship and Cultural Contacts (SSOD), itself disbanded in 1992 following the dissolution of the Soviet Union in December 1991.

In 1950, Kemenov was deputy director of the Institute of Art History.

He died in Moscow, and was buried in the Kuntsevo Cemetery.

Works
In 1947, Kemenov published an article "Features of Two Cultures" in English, French, German, and Russian that caught wide attention during early years of the Cold War. Arthur M. Schlesinger Jr. noted that Kemenov had attacked artists Pablo Picasso, Henry Moore, Georgia O'Keeffe, Paul Cézanne among others. In a 1950 article, Kemenov defended Social Realism and Marxist–Leninist theory of history and attacked bourgeois art historians in a manner "lurid and angry."

 "Aspects of Two Cultures" (aka "Features of Two Cultures"), Voks Bulletin (1947)
 "Against Reactionary Bourgeois Art and Art History" ("Protiv burzhuazanogo iskusstiva i iskusstovnaiia") (1951)
 Vasily Surikov, 1848–1916 (1970) with Vasiliĭ Ivanovich Surikov
 Velázquez in Soviet Museums: Analysis and Interpretation of the Paintings in the Context of His Oeuvre (1977)

References

1908 births
1988 deaths
People from Dnipro
Communist Party of the Soviet Union members
Full Members of the USSR Academy of Arts
Recipients of the Order of the Red Banner of Labour
Recipients of the USSR State Prize
Russian art critics
Russian art historians
Russian diplomats
Soviet art critics
Soviet art historians
Soviet diplomats
Burials at Kuntsevo Cemetery